Bijoy Krishna Modak (1906–1994) was an Indian politician. He was elected to the Lok Sabha, lower house of the Parliament of India from Hooghly and Arambagh in West Bengal as a member of the Communist Party of India (Marxist).

References

External links
  Official biographical sketch in Parliament of India website

1906 births
1994 deaths
India MPs 1967–1970
India MPs 1971–1977
India MPs 1977–1979
India MPs 1980–1984
Communist Party of India (Marxist) politicians from West Bengal
People from Hooghly district